"Let It Ride" is a 1974 single by Bachman-Turner Overdrive, written by Randy Bachman and Fred Turner, with the latter providing lead vocals. It was first recorded for the 1973 album Bachman–Turner Overdrive II. The single peaked at No. 23 on the U.S. Billboard Hot 100 on April 27, 1974 (making it BTO's first Top 40 song in the US), and spent two weeks at No. 14 on the Cash Box Top 100.  In Canada, the song reached No. 3.

Background
The tune was inspired by a traffic incident. While on tour in 1973 supporting The Doobie Brothers, the band was on a highway in their tour bus and got boxed in by a couple of trucks. When the bus and the trucks reached a rest area, the musicians confronted the truck drivers, who responded by saying the band members should settle down and just let it ride.

Reception
Cash Box called it a "hard rocking outing" saying that "the vocals, both up front and background harmonies, hit the mark and blend perfectly with the music." Record World said that "forceful, driving instrumental work comes to the forefront" and "gritty vocalizing clinches it."

Charts

Weekly

Year-end

Cover versions
The song was covered by Canadian rock band Big Sugar on their 1998 album, Heated. 
It was also covered by Canadian country music group Farmer's Daughter on their 1998 album This Is the Life. Their version was released as a single in 1999 and peaked at No. 30 on the RPM Country Tracks chart in Canada.
In 2015, Canadian heavy metal band Kobra and the Lotus covered the song on their first EP Words of the Prophets.

In other media
"Let It Ride" has appeared in a number of films and television series. It has been in films such as: 
Anchorman 2: The Legend Continues
Lovelace
The Hooker with a Heart of Gold
Halloween
Gutterballs
Invincible
Radio
As well as TV shows like:
 My Name Is Earl
The Wonder Years, Supernatural
Ed, "Ray Donovan" and "Mayans MC"

References

External links
Let It Ride by Bachman-Turner Overdrive - Songfacts, Let it Ride by Bachman-Turner Overdrive Songfacts

1973 songs
1974 singles
Songs written by Randy Bachman
Farmer's Daughter songs
Mercury Records singles
Bachman–Turner Overdrive songs
Songs written by Fred Turner (musician)